Irville is an unincorporated community in Muskingum County, in the U.S. state of Ohio.

History
Irville was laid out in 1815 by John Irvine, and named for him. A post office called Irville was established in 1816, and remained in operation until 1902.

References

Unincorporated communities in Muskingum County, Ohio
1815 establishments in Ohio
Populated places established in 1815
Unincorporated communities in Ohio